Pedanadipalli is a village in Vizianagaram district of the Indian state of Andhra Pradesh. It is located in Cheepurupalli mandal. It is 13km  from the Mandal headquarters and 43km from District headquarters. It is situated at 14km from the NationalHighway 16.

Education 

Two Mandal Parishad schools and one Zilla Parishad school serve the village.

Economy 
People in this village depends on Agriculture and the related works especially Sheep grazing and cattle milk.

Politics 
The village is a part of Cheepurupalli (Assembly constituency), an assembly segment of Vizianagaram (Lok Sabha constituency). Botcha Satyanarayana is the present MLA of the constituency, who won the 2019 Andhra Pradesh Legislative Assembly election from YSR Congress Party.

References 

Villages in Vizianagaram district